Anastasios "Tasos" Lagos (born 12 April 1992) is a Greek professional footballer who plays as a midfielder for Super League 2 club Anagennisi Karditsa.

Club career

The young defensive midfielder has joined the Academy of Panathinaikos, coming from Almyros F.C.  In 2007, he passed the doors of club's youth academy Paiania Athletic Center, to develop some years later in one of the most influential and promising players of the new generation of the club. Lagos for several years was a key player in the youth teams of Panathinaikos, making many appearances for Greece U19 and Greece U17 squads.

In 2007–08 season, José Peseiro was the first coach that promote him in the first team, while a few years later in the summer of 2011, was invited to Everton's training ground, to meet manager Sven-Göran Eriksson and his coaching staff. Moreover, he also came to the attention of Tottenham's manager Harry Redknapp who invited him for another trial.

Even if those trials were not successful, Lagos started to leave his sign. However, the largest step in his career was in the Greek Cup. It was December 20, 2011 in a match, against the Agrotikos Asteras F.C., when Giorgos Karagounis suffered  a small injury problem and Lagos entered the match as a substitute. Since then, the young midfielder became gradually member of the first team, with Jesualdo Ferreira giving him the opportunity to make his debut on 24 March 2012 in a Super League away game against OFI coming as a substitute. On 8 November 2012, he made the international debut with the club, in a UEFA Europa League away game against S.S. Lazio.

Tasos Lagos responded positively to the proposal to extend his contract with Panathinaikos until 2017 and will be considered as a member of the club for the next three years, completing a decade with the club.

On 3 October 2015, Lagos reached 100 appearances with the jersey of Panathinaikos.

On 25 June 2016, Zweite Bundesliga club Würzburger Kickers officially announced the signing of Panathinaikos' defensive midfielder until the summer of 2017.

On 24 August 2017, he signed a two years contract with Superleague club AEL. On 3 April 2018, AEL board announced the termination of his contract and released him as a free transfer.

On 10 January 2019, he travelled to Cyprus to complete a move to Ermis Aradippou. On 25 June 2019, Apollon Smyrni announced the signing of the Greek midfielder for an undisclosed fee. On 6 August 2021, he signed a contract with Super League Greece 2 club Anagennisi Karditsa as a free transfer.

Career statistics

(* includes Europa League, Champions League)
(** Superleague Greece Play-offs)

Honours

Panathinaikos
 Greek Cup: 2014

References

External links

1992 births
Living people
Greek footballers
Greece youth international footballers
Greece under-21 international footballers
Super League Greece players
Super League Greece 2 players
Cypriot First Division players
2. Bundesliga players
Panathinaikos F.C. players
Würzburger Kickers players
Athlitiki Enosi Larissa F.C. players
Ermis Aradippou FC players
Apollon Smyrnis F.C. players
Anagennisi Karditsa F.C. players
Association football midfielders
Greek expatriate footballers
Expatriate footballers in Germany
Greek expatriate sportspeople in Germany
Expatriate footballers in Cyprus
Greek expatriate sportspeople in Cyprus
People from Magnesia (regional unit)
Footballers from Thessaly